Owen Springs may refer to.

Owen Springs Power Station, a power station in Australia
Owen Springs Reserve, a protected area in Australia 
Owen Springs Station, a former cattle station in Australia

See also
Owen (disambiguation)